Bo is a set of several Chinese family names, including  ,  ,  ,  , etc. Among these names,  is the 213th most common surname in China at present, shared by at least 430,000 Chinese citizens, although when used as a surname it is generally pronounced .  None of the other characters pronounced  are currently in the top 300 surnames in China, although surname  is the 271st surname in the Hundred Family Surnames and is quite well known due to it being the family name of high-profile politicians Bo Xilai and his father Bo Yibo.

Notable people named Bo
According to a 2013 study, 薄 was the 337th most common surname, being shared by 140,000 people or 0.011% of the population, with the province with the most people having the name being Shandong.

Empress Dowager Bo (died 155 BC) of the Han dynasty
 Empress Bo (died 147 BC) of the Han dynasty
 Bo Yibo (1908 – 2007), Chinese communist politician 
 Bo Xilai (born 1949), son to Bo Yibo, former CPC Chongqing Committee Secretary
 Bo Bing (1921 – 2013), Chinese English grammar academic

Bo Yang, penname of Guō Dìngshēng (郭定生), a writer in Taiwan

Bo Cai, a minor leader of the Yellow Turban Rebellion in the Han dynasty

References 

Chinese-language surnames
Multiple Chinese surnames